Shahsavaran is a volcanic field in Iran. It covers an ellipse shaped area west of Bazman volcano. The field has erupted lava cones and lava flows, along with some explosive volcanic activity especially in the eastern part of the field. Volcanic rocks in the field are dominated by andesite, with subordinate basalt, dacite and rhyodacite. The volcanism has lasted from 12 million years ago to recent times, the 2010 Hosseinabad earthquake took place within the field but seems to be unrelated to volcanic activity.

Geology and geography 
This ellipse "points" to the volcanic arc formed by the Bazman, Taftan and Koh-i-Sultan volcanic arc.

The field features well preserved lava cones, associated with lava flows. The basal basaltic lava flows are interlayered with volcanic debris and more silicic lava flows. To a more recent phase of volcanism belong andesitic centres, some of which lie on river terraces and form easily recognizable coulees. Explosive activity has also left ignimbrites and pumices; such explosive activity took place in the eastern part of the field towards Bazman volcano and was accompanied by the formation of nuee ardente breccia.

Petrology and petrogenesis 
Andesites form the bulk of the products with subordinate dacites, as well as some rhyodacites which are found in the eastern part of the field, where the explosive activity took place. The dacites are found in the eastern part of the field. The rocks are porphyritic and follow the calc-alkaline trend, except the basalts which are of the aluminum-rich variety. Elemental composition is typical for island arc volcanoes, although strontium content is rather high. The rocks contain phenocrysts of clinopyroxene, orthopyroxene and plagioclase. Amphibole and olivine is also found in the rocks. Some rocks have a glassy composition. These rocks probably formed by subduction of oceanic crust and the interaction of anatexis products thereof with abovelying mantle, with some fractionation of the subsequently formed magma. The basement of the area is formed by even older (Oligocene-Eocene) volcanic rocks that contains intrusions of granodiorite.

Geologic history 
The field is of Tertiary-Quaternary age. Pliocene-Quaternary volcanism also took place north of the field where it borders the Lut, a large basaltic coulee of that age is found there and extends from a well preserved volcanic centre. Volcanic activity commenced 12 million years ago and continued until historical times, according to unpublished data by G. Conrad. A minor earthquake occurred on 20 December 2010 of magnitude 6.5 in the field, the 2010 Hosseinabad earthquake. A second earthquake of magnitude 6.2 occurred not far away on 27 January 2011. Little seismic activity is otherwise associated with the field and few faults have been identified there. The formation of fractures in the ground accompanied this seismic activity. The earthquake activity however does appear to be independent from any volcanic activity in the area, although the faults associated with this earthquake may influence the position of vents in the field.

Geological context 
Bazman volcano lies east of this field, sometimes it is even included in analyses of the field. Tectonically, the field is located between the Makran mountains in the south, a range formed by Paleocene flysch and older ophiolites, and the Lut block in the north which is a crustal block of Paleozoic-Mesozoic age that is buried beneath more recent sedimentary and volcanic rocks. To the south lies also the Jaz Murian depression. To the west the field is delimited by the Nayband fault. The field is in the Central Iranian volcanic belt, a mountain range with summits exceeding  of altitude. In this belt, volcanic activity commenced during the Cretaceous as submarine volcanism. A peak of activity occurred during the Eocene, afterwards andesitic-dacitic stratovolcanoes were formed during the Pliocene-Pleistocene. This volcanism may be associated either with a crustal weakness zone or subduction along the Zagros. Iran has two other volcanic belts, one associated with the Alborz and another at the Lut. Tectonic processes in Iran are ultimately dependent on the northward movement of the Arabic plate with respect to the Eurasian plate.

References

Sources 
 
 
 

Volcanoes of Iran
Volcanic fields